The Monihar Cinema Hall, or simply the Monihar, is a movie theater located at Jessore district in Bangladesh. Country's largest movie theater Monihar was launched on 8 December 1983. Due to a construction style that was ahead of the era, the hall became popular within short time of its launch. Film lovers from different countries of the world including Japan, Korea, Africa, Australia, Russia and England came to watch movies. Monihar is widely considered as one of the most influential factors of Bangladeshi film industry.

History 

Designed by Kazi Mohammad Hanif, the Cinema Hall used to be the main concentration of Dhallywood. Whenever a new film was about to get released, it was almost customary that the movie premiere should be held at Monihar. After its launch, the first movie to air in the hall was Director Dewan Nazrul's 'Johnny' starring Sohel Rana and Bobita.

Recent developments 

For the first time in its history, Monihar's operation got terminated on 22 July 2012. Owner of the hall claimed that the closure of the building was due to continued attacks by mafias in the area and their extortion. Later the hall got reopened after 20 days; upon the assurance of the administration and amidst the plight of the family members of the employees. However, the situation of the hall has not improved. Recently the hall has fallen into financial crisis. Previously there were 100 people employed by the hall. The reduction in the workforce is due to a recession in the business. The 40 current employees are also in financial hardship. Not only the staff of the hall, there are hundreds of jobs around Monihar that are in the risk due to the lackluster performance of the hall.

Features 

The number of seats in the movie hall of 4 bigha land is 1,400. Post construction of the hall was completed by an artist named Vishasa under the supervision of famous painter SM Sultan. The movie hall on the 4th floor is fully air-conditioned. There is a community center, a residential hotel and 40 shops inside Monihar. There are ram stairs, flashes, chandeliers etc. At present, Monihar employs 40 employees.

Type of cinemas 

 Bangladeshi movies
 Hollywood movies
 Indo-Bangla joint venture movies

References 

1983 establishments in Bangladesh
Jashore District
Cinemas in Bangladesh